UFC Fight Night: Overeem vs. Arlovski (also known as UFC Fight Night 87) was a mixed martial arts event held on May 8, 2016, at the Rotterdam Ahoy in Rotterdam, Netherlands.

Background
The event was the first that the organization hosted in the Netherlands.

The event was headlined by a heavyweight bout between the 2010 K-1 World Grand Prix Champion and former Strikeforce Heavyweight Champion Alistair Overeem and former UFC Heavyweight Champion Andrei Arlovski.

Rashid Magomedov was expected to face Chris Wade at the event. However, Magomedov pulled out of the fight in early March citing injury and was replaced by Rustam Khabilov.

Peter Sobotta was expected to face Dominic Waters at the event. However, Sobotta pulled out of the fight in late March citing injury and was replaced by Leon Edwards.

Paddy Holohan was expected to face Willie Gates at the event. However, on April 25, Holohan abruptly announced his retirement, citing a rare blood disorder. In turn, Gates faced Ulka Sasaki.

Nick Hein was expected to face Jon Tuck on the card, but pulled out just 6 days before the event due to injury. He was replaced two days later by promotional newcomer Josh Emmett.

Results

Bonus awards
The following fighters were awarded $50,000 bonuses:
Fight of the Night: None awarded
Performance of the Night: Alistair Overeem, Stefan Struve, Gunnar Nelson and Germaine de Randamie

See also
List of UFC events
2016 in UFC

References

UFC Fight Night
2016 in mixed martial arts
Mixed martial arts in the Netherlands
Sports competitions in Rotterdam
2016 in Dutch sport
May 2016 sports events in Europe